Canyon Lake High School is a public high school located in the Canyon Lake census-designated place in unincoporated Comal County, Texas, United States, near Fischer.

It is part of the Comal Independent School District and is one of 4 high schools in the district.  Canyon Lake High School is zoned for students who live primarily in the northwestern Comal County area, including most of the Canyon Lake CDP.  In 2015, the school was rated "Met Standard" by the Texas Education Agency.

It is classified as a 4A school by the University Interscholastic League.

Athletics
The Canyon Lake Hawks compete in the following sports:

 Baseball
 Bowling
 Basketball
 Cross Country
 Football
 Powerlifting
 Soccer
 Softball
 Swimming and Diving
 Tennis
 Track & Field
 Volleyball
 Dance

References

External links

High schools in Comal County, Texas
Public high schools in Texas
Educational institutions established in 2007
2007 establishments in Texas